, sometimes also called Bewitching Nozomi, is a manga series by Toshio Nobe which was adapted into a three episode anime OVA series in 1992.

Plot
Nozomi is a former actress who moves back to Japan from New Zealand. Upon arriving, she meets her fellow high school student neighbor Ryōtarō Shiba, who decides to join the high school boxing club.

Anime

Cast
 Nobutoshi Canna - Ryōtarō Shiba
 Hiromi Tsuru - Nozomi Egawa
 Kōhei Miyauchi - Eddie
 Keiichi Nanba - Hongō
 Ryūsei Nakao - Morino
 Toshiyuki Morikawa - Nanjō
 Noriko Uemura - Ryōtarō's mother
 Michitaka Kobayashi - Announcer
 Teruhisa Tsuyusaki - Baseball club member
 Yasuhiko Kawazu - Boxing club member
 Yukari Takagawa - Buryō
 Eiji Itō - Cameraman
 Yūko Sumitomo - Club member B
 Teruhisa Tsuyusaki - Company employee A
 Kanako Hoya - Drama club member
 Natsumi Yamada - Fan
 Tomomi Ōsone, Muri Wa - Female student
 Masaharu Satō - Gichō
 Arihiro Masuda - Ishii
 Yūsaku Yara - Itsuri
 Yasuhiko Kawazu - Jack
 Shinpachi Tsuji - Jackal
 Yuri Amano - Kitagawa
 Yuka Ōno - Yōko Kitagawa
 Mitsuru Ogata - Miyamoto
 Kiyoyuki Yanada - Ōniwa
 Kōji Ishii - Ōta
 Yūko Sumitomo - Private secretary
 Junji Kitajima - Referee
 Aruno Tahara - Reporter
 Kōji Ishii - Ring announcer
 Toshihiko Nakajima - Sakakoshi
 Hideyuki Tanaka - Sawamura
 Hiroshi Tamai - Student
 Kazuhiro Yamaga - Suzuki
 Kazumi Tanaka - Tōgo
 Toshihiko Nakajima - Watanabe-kaichō
 Miyuki Matsushita - Yamazaki
 Takashi Taguchi - Yamazaki-kaichō
 Natsumi Yamada - Hitomi Yamazaki
 Mitsuo Iwata - Yūgo

Releases
Laserdisc
Volume 1, TSL-5, ¥5800, September 21, 1994
Volume 2, TSL-6, ¥5800, October 21, 1994
Volume 3, TSL-7, ¥5800, November 21, 1994
Volume 1-3 collection, TSL-58, ¥9800, May 21, 1996

CDs
Nozomi Witches Sound MovieDrama CD.
Nozomi WitchesToei, TOCT-6290, September 27, 1991.
Nozomi Witches Original SoundtrackToei/TM Factory, TOCT-6639, August 26, 1992.

References

External links
 

1986 manga
1990 films
1992 anime OVAs
Boxing in anime and manga
Group TAC
Seinen manga
Shueisha franchises
Shueisha manga
Theatre in anime and manga
Live-action films based on manga
1990s Japanese-language films
Manga adapted into films